Oliver Smith (born 20 February 1993) is a student politician from Crich, Derbyshire in the United Kingdom who was appointed president of the Amber Valley branch of the Liberal Democrats for the year 2006.  He was elected unopposed as the president at the November 2005 Annual General Meeting of the branch, of which he has been a member since he was eight, and took up the one-year post on 1 January 2006 when he was just 12 years, 9 months and 13 days old, making him the youngest branch party president in British political history. His mother, Kate Smith, is the membership officer for the Amber Valley Liberal Democrats and was twice unsuccessful in the 2001 general election and 2005 general election. Oliver Smith succeeded 55-year-old Keith Falconbridge, who became chairman. Keith Falconbridge succeeded Oliver in 2007.

Smith's campaign points, in 2006, included the lowering of the voting age from 18 to 16 and the abolition of university tuition fees. He also wanted to see Tony Blair and Gordon Brown out of office, while he supported Charles Kennedy.

Smith was a pupil at Anthony Gell School, the school that Ellen McArthur attended. and went on to study History at Lincoln College, Oxford University.

References

External links
"Lib Dems get 'youngest' president", BBC News article, (published 5 January 2006; accessed 16 December 2006).

1993 births
Liberal Democrats (UK) politicians
English children
Place of birth missing (living people)
People from Amber Valley
Living people